Maria Moreno may refer to:

María Isabel Moreno (born 1981), Spanish road bicycle racer
Maria Moreno (activist) (1920–1988), American farmworker and labor organizer
María Moreno (painter) (1933–2020), Spanish painter, wife of Antonio López García
María Rosa Moreno, Spanish taekwondo practitioner